SS Central America, known as the Ship of Gold, was a  sidewheel steamer that operated between Central America and the East Coast of the United States during the 1850s. She was originally named the SS George Law, after George Law of New York.  The ship sank in a hurricane in September 1857, along with 425 of her 578 passengers and crew and 30,000 pounds (13,600 kg) of gold, contributing to the Panic of 1857.

Sinking
On September 3, 1857, 477 passengers and 101 crew left the City of Aspinwall, now the Panamanian port of Colón, sailing for New York City under the command of William Lewis Herndon. After a stop in Havana, the ship continued north.

On September 9, 1857, the ship was caught up in a Category 2 hurricane while off the coast of the Carolinas. By September 11, the  winds and heavy seas had shredded her sails, she was taking on water, and her boiler was threatening to fail. A leak in one of the seals between the paddle wheel shafts and the ship's sides sealed its fate. At noon that day, her boiler could no longer maintain fire. Steam pressure dropped, shutting down both the bilge pumps. Also, the paddle wheels that kept her pointed into the wind failed as the ship settled by the stern. The passengers and crew flew the ship's flag inverted (a distress sign in the US) to signal a passing ship. No one came.

A bucket brigade was formed, and her passengers and crew spent the night fighting a losing battle against the rising water. During the calm of the hurricane, attempts were made to get the boiler running again, but these failed. The second half of the storm then struck. The ship was now on the verge of foundering. Without power, the ship was carried along with the storm and the strong winds would not abate. The next morning, September 12, two ships were spotted, including the brig Marine. Only 100 passengers, primarily women and children, made their way over in lifeboats. The ship remained in an area of intense winds and heavy seas that pulled the ship and most of her company away from rescue. Central America sank at 8:00 that evening.  As a consequence of the sinking, 425 people were killed. A Norwegian bark, Ellen, rescued an additional 50 from the waters. Another three were picked up over a week later, in a lifeboat.

Aftermath
In the immediate aftermath of the sinking, greatest attention was paid to the loss of life, which was described as "appalling" and as having "no parallel" among American navigation disasters. The valuation of the ship itself was substantially less than those lost in other disasters of the period, being $140,000.

Commander William Lewis Herndon, a distinguished officer who had served during the Mexican–American War and explored the Amazon Valley, was captain of Central America, and went down with his ship. Two US Navy ships were later named USS Herndon in his honor, as was the town of Herndon, Virginia. Two years after the sinking, his daughter Ellen married Chester Alan Arthur, later the 21st President of the United States.

Wreck, gold, and artifacts

Thompson expedition

Discovery of wreck and recovery of gold and artifacts

The ship was located by the Columbus-America Discovery Group of Ohio, led by Tommy Gregory Thompson, using Bayesian search theory. A remotely operated vehicle (ROV) was sent down on September 11, 1988. Significant amounts of gold and artifacts were recovered and brought to the surface by another ROV built specifically for the recovery. The total value of the recovered gold was estimated at $100–150 million. A recovered gold ingot weighing  sold for a record $8 million and was recognized as the most valuable piece of currency in the world at that time.
The Columbus-America Discovery Group's eventual discovery of the wreckage may have been spurred on by initial interest by Harry John, an heir to the Miller Brewing Company fortune who near the end of his life launched unsuccessful, haphazard treasure hunts funded by a supposedly charitable foundation he had run for decades.

Legal issues
Thirty-nine insurance companies filed suit, claiming that because they paid damages in the 19th century for the lost gold, they had the right to it. The team that found it argued that the gold had been abandoned. After a legal battle, 92% of the gold was awarded to the discovery team in 1996.

Thompson was sued in 2005 by several of the investors who had provided $12.5 million in financing, and in 2006 by several members of his crew, over a lack of returns for their respective investments. In 2009 he had an off-shore account in the Cook Islands of $4.16 million. Thompson went into hiding in 2012. A receiver was appointed to take over Thompson's companies and, if possible, salvage more gold from the wreck, in order to recover money for Thompson's various creditors.

Thompson was located in January 2015, along with assistant Alison Antekeier, by United States Marshals Service agents and was extradited to Ohio to provide an accounting of the expedition profits. In November 2018, Thompson agreed to surrender 500 gold coins, but then claimed he had no access to the missing coins. On November 28, 2018, a jury awarded Investors $19.4 million in compensatory damages: $3.2 million to the Dispatch Printing Company — which had put up $1 million of $22 million invested — and $16.2 million to the court-appointed receiver for the other investors.

Subsequent events

In March 2014, a contract was awarded to Odyssey Marine Exploration to conduct archeological recovery and conservation of the remaining shipwreck. The original expedition had only excavated "5 percent" of the ship.

Universal Coin & Bullion, a precious metals dealer based in Beaumont, Texas, exhibited gold and silver coins recovered from Central America in May 2018.

Heritage Auctions sold several gold pieces recovered from the Central America at auction in 2019, highlighted by the very large size of the 174.04-ounce (4.93 kg) Harris, Marchand & Co. gold ingot which sold for $528,000.

It was displayed publicly at the Columbus Museum of Art in Columbus, Ohio, in 1992; at the Columbus Zoo and Aquarium in Liberty Township in Delaware County, Ohio, in 1993; and at the American Numismatic Association′s World′s Fair of Money in Rosemont, Illinois, in 2021. It was offered as a gift to the United States Naval Academy in Annapolis, Maryland, in August 2021, and the United States Department of the Navy accepted the offer. It was positioned next to the Herndon Monument at the Academy and was dedicated in a ceremony on May 23, 2022.

See also
Other successful treasure recoveries include:
 Nuestra Señora de Atocha (1622)
 SS Georgiana (1865)
 SS Republic (1865)
 RMS Republic (1903)

References

Further reading
 Kinder, Gary. (1998). Ship of Gold in the Deep Blue Sea. Atlantic Monthly Press. 
 Thompson, Tommy. (2000). America's Lost Treasure. Atlantic Monthly Press. 
 Klare, Norman. (1991 and 2005). The Final Voyage of the Central America, 1857: The Saga of a Gold Rush Steamship.  and 
 Stone, Lawrence D. Search for the SS Central America: Mathematical Treasure Hunting . Technical Report, Metron Inc. Reston, Virginia.
 Concepción de León, New York Times, Dec. 19, 2020: Treasure Hunter Notches 5th Year in Prison for Refusing to Forfeit His Loot

External links
 
Final Voyage of the Central America by Normand E. Klare 1982 Second Edition 
America's Lost Treasure: The Wreck of the SS Central America 
The Central America Engulphed (sic) in the Ocean
Wreck of the Central America
"The Central America: Further of the Disaster", New York Times, 23 Sept 1857
– "Detailed and Very Interesting Statement of Captain Badger" and "Protest of the Surviving Officers"
NOAA list of deadliest hurricanes
 http://www.wncrocks.com/ARCTIC%20DISCOVERER.html

1852 ships
1857 meteorology
Maritime incidents in September 1857
1988 archaeological discoveries
Merchant ships of the United States
Shipwrecks in the Atlantic Ocean
Shipwrecks of the Carolina coast
Treasure from shipwrecks
California Gold Rush
Paddle steamers of the United States